Chapel Carn Brea is an elevated Hercynian granite outcrop, owned by the National Trust  at the southern edge of the civil parish of St Just, Cornwall, England, United Kingdom. It should not be confused with another Carn Brea, the hill overlooking the Camborne–Redruth area.

History

The hill is an important historical site showing evidence of neolithic and early Bronze Age activity, as well as the remains of the thirteenth century chapel from which it is named. On the slopes and summit there were once eleven barrows, but only seven now remain, mostly in a poor state.

On the summit is a  diameter entrance grave (also known as chambered cairn) which had a south-facing entrance and was built in the late neolithic. This type of cairn is unique to west Cornwall and the Isles of Scilly, and consist of a long narrow chamber covered with large slabs and surrounded with a kerb of large stones; they are thought to be communal burial places. The chapel, which was built on top of the cairn, was pulled down in 1816 and was said to be the home of holy men or monks. A manuscript from 1396 kept at the County Records Office, Truro records the ′beaconage′ received from fishermen for the burning an ′ecclesiastical light′, normally a brazier or fire basket at the ″Chapel of St Michael of Bree″. This is the earliest record of a navigational light in Cornwall. In 1868 and 1879 William Copeland Borlase excavated the site and built a new cairn which was destroyed by the building of a Second World War radar observation post, which was manned by the Royal Air Force. A plaque, near the car park is dedicated to those that served there.

The Old Cornwall Society continues to light a beacon fire for the summer solstice on 23 June each year.

References

External links

 The Megalithic Portal
 Cornish Ancient Site Protection Network
 Chapel Carn Brea

Archaeological sites in Cornwall
Bronze Age sites in Cornwall
Hills of Cornwall
Lighthouses in Cornwall
National Trust properties in Cornwall
Neolithic England
Penwith
St Just in Penwith